Choreutis inscriptana is a moth in the family Choreutidae. It was described by Snellen in 1875. It is found on Malacca and Sulawesi.

References

Natural History Museum Lepidoptera generic names catalog

Choreutis
Moths described in 1875